Frankfurt Seamount, also known as Frankfurt Knoll, is an undersea mountain in the North Atlantic Ocean, located about  south of Cape Race on the North American continental rise.

Frankfurt Seamount is one of the seven named Fogo Seamounts. Its name is derived from SS Frankfurt, a German steamship that was the first to respond to the distress signal from the sinking RMS Titanic.

References

External links

Fogo Seamounts